Vernon L. Sommerdorf (April 9, 1921 – October 19, 2009) was an American physician and politician.

Sommerdorf was born in Brownton, McLeod County, Minnesota. He graduated from University of Minnesota Medical School and served in the United States Navy during World War II. Sommerdorf lived with his wife and family in Saint Paul, Minnesota and he practiced medicine in Saint Paul. Soommerdorf served in the Minnesota House of Representatives from 1965 to 1972. He died in Saint Paul, Minnesota.

References

1921 births
2009 deaths
People from McLeod County, Minnesota
Politicians from Saint Paul, Minnesota
Physicians from Minnesota
Military personnel from Minnesota
University of Minnesota Medical School alumni
Members of the Minnesota House of Representatives